The New York Trilogy is a series of novels by American writer Paul Auster.  Originally published sequentially as City of Glass (1985), Ghosts (1986) and The Locked Room (1986), it has since been collected into a single volume. The Trilogy is a postmodern interpretation of detective and mystery fiction, exploring various philosophical themes.

Plot

City of Glass 
The first story, City of Glass, features an author of detective fiction who becomes a private investigator and descends into madness as he becomes embroiled in the investigation of a case.  It explores layers of identity and reality, from Paul Auster the writer of the novel to the unnamed "author" who reports the events as reality, to "Paul Auster the writer", a character in the story, to "Paul Auster the detective", who may or may not exist in the novel, to Peter Stillman the younger, to Peter Stillman the elder and, finally, to Daniel Quinn, the protagonist.

City of Glass has an intertextual relationship with Miguel de Cervantes' Don Quixote. Not only does the protagonist Daniel Quinn share his initials with the knight, but when Quinn finds "Paul Auster the writer," Auster is in the midst of writing an article about the authorship of Don Quixote. Auster calls his article an "imaginative reading," and in it he examines possible identities of Cide Hamete Benengeli, the narrator of the Quixote.

Ghosts 
The second story, Ghosts, is about a private eye called Blue, trained by Brown, who is investigating a man named Black on Orange Street for a client named White. Blue writes written reports to White who in turn pays him for his work. Blue becomes frustrated and loses himself as he becomes immersed in the life of Black.

The Locked Room 
The Locked Room is the story of a writer who lacks the creativity to produce fiction. Fanshawe, his childhood friend, has produced creative work, and when he disappears the writer publishes his work and replaces him in his family.  "Paul Auster", the name, does not appear in this story as it does in City of Glass, but Auster breaks the 4th wall by writing about writing of the previous books in the trilogy "...I could not have started this book. The same holds for the two books that come before it, City of Glass and Ghosts." He also references clearly autobiographical moments such as his encounter with composer Wyschnegradsky when Auster was a young man in Paris. The title is a reference to a "locked-room mystery", a popular form of early detective fiction.

Adaptations 
City of Glass was adapted in 1994 into a critically acclaimed experimental graphic novel by Paul Karasik and David Mazzucchelli.  It was published as City of Glass: A Graphic Mystery in 2004.

In March 2006, published as text with illustrations by Art Spiegelman and an Introduction by Luc/Lucy Sante - ISBN 9780143039839

In 2009, Audible.com produced an audio version of The New York Trilogy, narrated by Joe Barrett, as part of its Modern Vanguard line of audiobooks.

In 2016, Edward Einhorn adapted City of Glass as a play Off-Broadway, at the New Ohio 

In 2017, Duncan Macmillan produced another adaptation as a play, which showed for a short period at HOME in Manchester, before transferring to the Lyric, Hammersmith. It was a co-production between HOME, the Lyric, and 59 Productions.

Bibliography

Editions
Auster, Paul The New York Trilogy. (London: Faber and Faber, 1987) .

A 2006 reissue by Penguin Books is fronted by new pulp magazine-style covers by comic book illustrator Art Spiegelman.

Criticism
Books
Barone, Dennis (ed.) Beyond the Red Notebook (Pennsylvania: University of Pennsylvania Press, 1995)  (paperback). Two essays on City of Glass and The Locked Room, respectively.
Bloom, Harold (ed.) Bloom's Modern Critical Views: Paul Auster (Broomall, PA: Chelsea House Publisher, 2004) . Several essays on The New York Trilogy. 
Martin, Brendan Paul Auster's Postmodernity (Oxford: Routledge, 2008)  (hardback). 
Nicol, Bran The Cambridge Introduction to Postmodern Fiction (Cambridge: Cambridge University Press, 2009) . Chapter 7, 'Two postmodern genres: cyberpunk and detective fiction', includes a section on City of Glass.

Notes

External links 
 Paul Auster's "The New York Trilogy" as Postmodern Detective Fiction (English abstract of a thesis by Matthias Kugler) 
"The New York Trilogy by Paul Auster", reviewed by Ted Gioia, ( The New Canon)

1987 American novels
Literary trilogies
Metafictional novels
American mystery novels
Novel series
Novels by Paul Auster
Novels set in New York City
Faber and Faber books
Postmodern books
Postmodern novels
Novels adapted into comics
1987 debut novels